Mallosia herminae is a species of beetle in the family Cerambycidae. It was described by Edmund Reitter in 1890. It is known from Iran, Azerbaijan, Armenia, and Turkey.

Subspecies
There are two subspecies:
 Mallosia herminae herminae Reitter, 1890
 Mallosia herminae gobustanica Danilevsky, 1990

Description and habitat
Adults are 15 to 42 mm in length. It flies from May to June, and feeds on Ferula and Prangos species.

References

Saperdini
Beetles of Asia
Beetles described in 1890
Taxa named by Edmund Reitter